Josh Green (born November 15, 2002) is an American racing driver. He currently competes in the 2023 INDY NXT driving for HMD Motorsports with Dale Coyne Racing. Green previously competed with Turn 3 Motorsport in the 2022 Indy Pro 2000 Championship.

Racing career

Karting 
Green first competed in racing driving indoor karts  in 2015. He quickly moved into outdoor karting at Oakland Valley Raceway Park in Cuddebackville, NY, running in club and regional events in 2016. Over the next two years, Green competed in regional and national events, and won the IAME X30 Junior championship in the 2018 WKA Manufacturers Cup. He was also invited to race in the IAME International Final at Le Mans, France.

Junior formulae 
I​n 2019, Green added a formula car racing program to his karting schedule running in the FRP F1600 Championship Series. He won eight races and finished on the podium in 18 of the 21 races, finishing second overall in the championship. This season-long performance caught the eye of Team USA Scholarship’s Jeremy Shaw who invited Josh to the program’s shootout at Road America in September 2019. Green was one of the two drivers selected to join Team USA at the BRSCC Formula Ford Festival and Walter Hayes Trophy events in England. He finished in the top-10 at the Festival and was the top qualifier in the wet for the WHT at Silverstone.

USF2000 Championship 
Green made his Road to Indy debut at Portland International Raceway in September of 2019, finishing in the top-10 in the second race of the weekend.

In 2020, Josh piloted the No. 2 Cape Motorsports Tatuus USF-17 in the 2020 Road to Indy Presented by Cooper Tire USF2000 Championship. He joined the nine-time series champions having developed his skills over the last four years competing in national level karting and the F1600 Championship Series.  He finished sixth in the championship with three podiums and 12 top 10 finishes.

Indy Pro 2000 
On November 18, 2021, it was announced that Green would move up to Indy Pro 2000 with Turn 3 Motorsport to compete in the 2022 season.

Indy NXT 
On September 15, 2022, Green announced that he would move up another rung in the Road to Indy ladder to Indy NXT in 2023 and drive for HMD Motorsports with Dale Coyne Racing.

Racing record

Career summary 

* Season still in progress.

American open-wheel racing results

U.S. F2000 National Championship 
(key) (Races in bold indicate pole position) (Races in italics indicate fastest lap) (Races with * indicate most race laps led)

Indy Pro 2000 Championship 
(key) (Races in bold indicate pole position) (Races in italics indicate fastest lap) (Races with * indicate most race laps led)

Indy NXT
(key) (Races in bold indicate pole position) (Races in italics indicate fastest lap) (Races with L indicate a race lap led) (Races with * indicate most race laps led)

References 

2002 births
Living people
Formula Ford drivers
Racing drivers from New York (state)
U.S. F2000 National Championship drivers
People from Mount Kisco, New York
Indy Pro 2000 Championship drivers
Team Pelfrey drivers

Indy Lights drivers
Dale Coyne Racing drivers
HMD Motorsports drivers